Ryecroft may refer to:

Ryecroft, Greater Manchester
Ryecroft, South Yorkshire
Ryecroft, West Midlands
Ryecroft, West Yorkshire